Elections for the Democratic Constituent Congress were held in Peru on 22 November 1992, following a self-coup (known as the "autogolpe") by President Alberto Fujimori on 5 April. The elections were boycotted by the American Popular Revolutionary Alliance, the second largest party in the Chamber of Deputies, and were won by Fujimori's Cambio 90–New Majority alliance, which took 44 of the 80 seats.

The Congress drew up a new constitution, which was promulgated in 1993 after being approved in a referendum. The new constitution allowed for presidents to be re-elected, as well as making the Congress a unicameral legislature.

Results

References

Elections in Peru
Peru
1992 in Peru